Moorehead Phase may refer to:

Moorehead Phase (Cahokia), an archaeological phase of the Cahokia and environs 1200-1275
Moorehead Phase of the Laurentian Tradition or Moorehead burial tradition, of the Red Paint People, 3000-1000 BCE